Carlos Guevara (born 1982) is an American baseball player.

Carlos Guevara may also refer to:

 Carlos Eduardo Guevara Villabón (born 1977), Colombian politician
 Carlos Guevara (footballer) (born 1930), Mexican football player
 Carlos Arvelo Guevara (1784–1862), Venezuelan physician and academic
 Carlos Rodríguez Guevara (born 1969), Mexican politician